L'Otage is a three-act theatre play by the French author Paul Claudel, and the first one of La Trilogie des Coûfontaine.

Mises-en-scène 
 1913: Théâtre Scala, London 
 1914: Lugné-Poe, Théâtre de l'Œuvre
 1928: Firmin Gémier, Théâtre de l'Odéon
 1931: Ève Francis, Théâtre des Arts
 1934: Comédie-Française
 1947: Théâtre national de Chaillot
 1955: Hubert Gignoux, Centre dramatique de l'Ouest
 1962: Bernard Jenny, Théâtre du Vieux-Colombier
 1962: Jean Davy, Tréteaux de France.
 1968: Jean-Marie Serreau, Comédie-Française 
 1977: Guy Rétoré, Théâtre de l'Est parisien, Festival d'Avignon
 1995: Marcel Maréchal, Théâtre du Rond-Point
 2002: Bernard Sobel, Théâtre de Gennevilliers

See also 
 Le Pain dur
 Le Père humilié
 List of works by Paul Claudel

External links 
 L'Otage, édition Gallimard 1911, L'otage on Internet Archive.
  les Archives du Spectacle

References 

1911 plays
French plays